Sultan Al-Bishi (Arabic: سلطان البيشي; born 28 January 1990) is a footballer player who plays as a right back . Al-Bishi started out his career at Al-Hilal where he spent 8 years before joining Al-Raed on loan. At the end of his loan spell, Al-Bishi was released and he subsequently joined Al-Faisaly.

External links
Saudi League Profile

Saudi Arabian footballers
Association football defenders
1990 births
Living people
Al Hilal SFC players
Al-Raed FC players
Al-Faisaly FC players
Khaleej FC players
Al-Anwar Club players
Bisha FC players
Al-Jubail Club players
Saudi First Division League players
Saudi Professional League players
Saudi Second Division players
Saudi Fourth Division players
Saudi Third Division players
Saudi Arabia youth international footballers